Trechus alicantinus is a species of ground beetle in the subfamily Trechinae. It was described by Espanol in 1971.

References

alicantinus
Beetles described in 1971